Ferdinando Porta (1689–1767) was an Italian painter of the late-Baroque. Born in  Milan. The engraver Francesco Londonio was one of his pupils. He painted frescoes in the Palazzo Brentano, Corbetta.

References

1689 births
1767 deaths
17th-century Italian painters
Italian male painters
18th-century Italian painters
Painters from Milan
Italian Baroque painters
18th-century Italian male artists